The 1921 Wellington City mayoral election was part of the New Zealand local elections held that same year. In 1921, elections were held for the Mayor of Wellington plus other local government positions including fifteen city councillors. The polling was conducted using the standard first-past-the-post electoral method.

Background
The long serving incumbent Mayor John Luke did not seek re-election. Robert Wright defeated Pat Hickey for the mayoralty in a two horse race. To replace retiring Mayor Luke five "anti-Labour" candidates emerged, which caused fear of vote splitting and a repeat of the 1912 election. As such, two immediately withdrew and the remaining three agreed to submit to the decision of an impartial committee to decide which one of them was most suitable. The election was also notable due to the success of Annie McVicar, who became the first woman to be elected as a city councillor in Wellington's history.

Mayoralty results

Councillor results

Notes

References

Mayoral elections in Wellington
1921 elections in New Zealand
Politics of the Wellington Region
1920s in Wellington